Good Neighbor Sam is a 1964 American Eastman Color screwball comedy film co-written and directed by David Swift, based on the 1963 novel of the same name by Jack Finney. The film stars Jack Lemmon, Romy Schneider, Dorothy Provine, Michael Connors, Edward Andrews, Louis Nye, Robert Q. Lewis, and Edward G. Robinson.

The screenplay was the motion picture debut of James Fritzell and Everett Greenbaum, who had written many American television sitcoms including The Andy Griffith Show and Mister Peepers (created by David Swift). Greenbaum also created the mobile sculpture featured in the film.

Plot
Sam Bissell, a hard-working San Francisco advertising executive, has two young daughters and a loving wife, Min.

An extremely important client, Simon Nurdlinger, is considering taking his business elsewhere when he believes there are no "family men" working at Sam's company. Sam's boss, Mr. Burke, introduces the client to Sam. The client is delighted by Sam and agrees to do business with him and the company. Sam feels his career is now on the way up and he goes home to celebrate with his wife. There, he meets his wife's longtime friend and their new next-door neighbor, Janet, and they all have dinner together to celebrate his promotion and Janet's new home. Sam gets drunk and tumbles down the grand carpeted staircase of the Fairmont Hotel, knocking down a waiter carrying trays of meals.

Janet, a beautiful woman, is recently divorced from her husband Howard and is happier than ever. She has also come into a large inheritance from her grandfather, which carries the stipulation that she must still be married to Howard in order to receive the inheritance. State law dictates that a divorce is not final until a year from final settlement. Since only six months have passed, Janet decides to hide the divorce from her cousins Irene and Jack who stand to inherit if Janet is disqualified.

With Howard unavailable, Sam is pressed to impersonate him when Irene and Jack arrive for a visit. Having never met Howard, Irene and Jack seem convinced but begin watching the couple with a telescopic surveillance camera hidden in a phony workmen's truck nearby. Janet and Sam (with Min's complicity) are thereby forced to continue the charade for several days, with Sam cohabiting and being driven to work by Janet, and sneaking in to occasionally visit Min through the back yard, or hidden in a laundry basket.  When caught pretending by Mr. Burke and Mr. Nurdlinger, Sam and Janet are then forced into a double charade in which Janet pretends to be Min. The situation begins to unravel when Irene and Jack hire a private investigator to keep watch on Sam and Janet, and Howard re-enters the picture. Sam panics after noticing new advertising billboards around the city showing his face with Janet's, and so paints clown faces on them late the last night before the attorney is to give Howard and Janet their inheritance.

Cast

Production
The film, set in San Francisco, makes use of obligatory exterior shots, including a long montage of scenes of Sam driving his car all over the city, up and down hills, as well as the curvy block of Lombard Street, as so many directors love to portray. The remainder of the film was shot in the Los Angeles area, both on location (including the Bradbury Building) and at the studio.

Reception
The film grossed $9,072,726 at the box office, earning $5.3 million in rentals.

See also
 List of American films of 1964

References

External links

 
 
 
 
 

1964 films
1964 comedy films
1960s English-language films
1960s screwball comedy films
American screwball comedy films
Columbia Pictures films
Films about advertising
Films based on American novels
Films based on works by Jack Finney
Films directed by David Swift
Films scored by Frank De Vol
Films set in San Francisco
Films set in the San Francisco Bay Area
Films shot in San Francisco
1960s American films